Maksi Jelenc (born 26 May 1951) is a Slovenian cross-country skier. He competed in the men's 15 kilometre event at the 1976 Winter Olympics.

References

External links
 

1951 births
Living people
Slovenian male cross-country skiers
Olympic cross-country skiers of Yugoslavia
Cross-country skiers at the 1976 Winter Olympics
Sportspeople from Kranj